Thomas Babington Macaulay (17 January 1826 – 17 January 1878) was a Nigerian priest and educator, first principal and founder of CMS Grammar School, Lagos, and father of Nigerian nationalist Herbert Macaulay.

Life
T. B. Macaulay was born in Kissy, Sierra Leone on 17 January 1826, to Yoruba parents who were liberated by the British West Africa Squadron from the Trans Atlantic Slave Trade. Macaulay's father was Ojo-Oriare from Ikirun in old Oyo Province while his mother was Kilangbe from Ile-Ogbo also in present Osun State (old Oyo Province). T.B. Macaulay trained at CMS Training Institute, Islington and King's College, London. T.B. Macaulay was a junior associate of Bishop Samuel Ajayi Crowther, whose second daughter (Abigail Crowther) he married in 1854.

Death
T. B. Maculay died on his birthday (17 January 1878) from smallpox in Lagos  and was buried at Ajele Cemetery.

Babington Macaulay Junior Seminary, a co-educational boarding school in Ikorodu, Lagos, is named after him.

References

1826 births
1878 deaths
Nigerian Anglicans
Sierra Leone Creole people
Fourah Bay College alumni
Yoruba Christian clergy
19th-century Nigerian people
Deaths from smallpox
Saro people
Aku (ethnic group)
History of Lagos
Nigerian people of Sierra Leonean descent
Sierra Leonean emigrants to Nigeria
Yoruba educators
Nigerian educators
Abiodun family
Burials in Lagos State
Sierra Leonean people of Yoruba descent
Founders of Nigerian schools and colleges
People from colonial Nigeria
Educators from Lagos
19th-century Nigerian educators
Alumni of King's College London
Alumni of the Church Missionary Society College, Islington
Heads of schools in Nigeria
7.  Thomas Babington Macaulay was also named after a school in Ikorodu, Lagos